Vitex evoluta is a species of plant in the family Lamiaceae. It is endemic to New Caledonia.

References

Endemic flora of New Caledonia
evoluta
Endangered plants
Taxonomy articles created by Polbot